Saipung is a village in East Jaintia Hills district, Meghalaya, India. It is the headquarters of the Saipung Sub-Division. The population was 1,431 as per the 2011 Indian census. Located about 136 km from the state's capital Shillong, Saipung is inhabited by the Biate people.

Demographics
The inhabitants are Biates, one of the indigenous ethnic tribes of Meghalaya.

As per the Indian 2011 census, the Saipung village had a population of 1431 of which 731 are males while 700 are females. 20.13 % of the total population was under 6 years of age.
Saipung has a higher literacy rate compared to Meghalaya. In 2011, literacy rate of Saipung village was 92.30 % compared to 74.43 % of Meghalaya. Male literacy stands at 95.01 % while female literacy rate was 89.50 %. 

The primary language spoken in Saipung is Biate. For interacting with outsiders, English or Khasi is used.

The dominant religion in Saipung is Christianity followed by almost all the inhabitants.

Education
Educational Institutions in Saipung are:
 Tuinar LP School
 Saipung West Govt LP School
 Saipung East Govt LP School
 Prudence English School
 Thanga Darnei Memorial School
 Saipung Secondary School
 RMSA High School
 Tuinar UP School
 Albert UP English School Private.
 Greenhill UP School

References

http://www.census2011.co.in/data/village/279546-saipung-meghalaya.html

Villages in East Jaintia Hills district